This List of streets and squares in Chernihiv

Squares in Chernihiv
Krasna Square
Victory Square, Chernihiv
Peoples' Friendship Square
Bohdan Khmelnytsky Square
Popudrenka Garden Square
Heroes of Stalingrad Square
Five Corners Square
Aviators Square
Alexander Square
Station Square
Cathedral Square

Streets in Chernihiv
 Myru Avenue
 Remeslennaya Streets
 Pyrohova Street
 Victory Avenue
 Lyubetska Street
 Street Shevchenko
 Rokossovsky Street
 Kotsiubynskoho Street
 vulytsia Zhabynskoho
 Ivan Mazepa Street
 Pobedy Avenue
 Novozavodsky
 Honcha vulytsia
 Peremohy Avenue
 Kitseva Street
 Nosivka
 Kotsiubynskoho Street
 Polubotka Street
 Shevchenko Street
 Pyatnitskaya Street
 Malinovsky Street

References

Geography of Chernihiv
Chernihiv-related lists